Lake Darling is a lake in Douglas County, in the U.S. state of Minnesota.

Lake Darling was named for Andrew Darling, who settled there in 1860.

See also
List of lakes in Minnesota

References

Lakes of Minnesota
Lakes of Douglas County, Minnesota